National Society may refer to:
Italian National Society
National Society Daughters of the American Colonists
National Society for Colitis and Crohn's Disease
National Society for Earthquake Technology - Nepal
National Society for Hispanic Professionals
National Society for Human Rights
National Society for Medical Research
National Society for Promoting Religious Education
National Society for Road Safety
National Society for Women's Suffrage
National Society for the Gifted and Talented
National Society for the Prevention of Cruelty to Children
National Society of Accountants
National Society of Arts and Letters
National Society of Black Engineers
National Society of Black Physicists
National Society of Blackjacks
National Society of Brushmakers and General Workers
National Society of Certified Healthcare Business Consultants
National Society of Collegiate Scholars
National Society of Consulting Soil Scientists
National Society of Film Critics
National Society of Genetic Counselors
National Society of Hispanic MBAs
National Society of Hispanic Physicists
National Society of Metal Mechanics
National Society of Minorities in Hospitality
National Society of Mural Painters
National Society of Operative Printers and Assistants
National Society of Professional Engineers